N 351 is the Rundata catalog number for a medieval runic inscription carved on a piece of wood that was found at the north portal of the Borgund stave church in Norway.

Description
This runic inscription states that it was carved by a man named Þórir into a piece of wood while visiting the church during the mass of Saint Olaf during the Middle Ages. Olaf was king of Norway from 1015 to 1028 C.E. and legally recognized Christianity as the nation's religion in 1024, and in the century after his death was recognized as a saint. His feast day is celebrated on July 29, the date of his death.

The inscription testifies to lingering beliefs in the pagan Norns, the female beings who rule the fates of the various races in Norse mythology. Here Þórir blames the Norns for his troubles, just as the characters do in the Reginsmál and Sigurðarkviða hin skamma of the Poetic Edda. One of the Bryggen inscriptions, listed as B145 or as N B145 M under Rundata, also refers to the Norns.

Inscription
Transliteration from Scandinavian Runic-text Database (Rundata).

Transcription
þo=rir · ræist · runa=r · þessa=r · þan · olaus·mess·o=æpþa=n ¶ …r han · fo=r · he=r um ¶ ⁓ bæþe= =ge=rþo= =no=(r)ne=r · uæl · o=k · il=la · mikla · møþe ¶ g skapaþu · þær mer

Transliteration
Þórir reist rúnar þessar þann Ólausmessaptan, [e]r han fór hér um. Bæði gerðu nornir vel ok illa, mikla mœði … skǫpuðu þær mér.

Translation
Þórir carved these runes on the eve of Olaus-mass, when he travelled past here. The norns did both good and evil, great toil … they created for me.

See also
List of runestones

References

Other sources
Simek, Rudolf (translated by Angela Hall) (1996). Dictionary of Northern Mythology. D. S. Brewer. , p. 237.

Runic inscriptions